Edcarlos Conceição Santos (born 10 May 1985 in Salvador, Bahia), known simply as Edcarlos, is a Brazilian professional footballer who plays as a central defender.

Club career
Edcarlos comes from the youth of São Paulo. In 2004, he joined the first team of the club, being part of the historic 2005 team that conquered the Campeonato Paulista and the Copa Libertadores and then the FIFA Club World Cup. 
He played the two games at the Club World Cup, helping São Paulo win the title for the first time in the club's history. The following year, he helped the team win their first Campeonato Brasileiro since 1991.

In 2007, he moved to Europe and signed with the Portuguese club Benfica in August 2007 for €1.8M. Under coach José Antonio Camacho he was a regular player and played among other things in the UEFA Champions League and the UEFA Cup, partnering with Luisão, due to David Luiz injury. However his performances were subpar and he moved on loan the following year, returning to his native Brazil, to Fluminense. After good performances in the first six months, he gradually lost his place, after getting less and less games.

In January 2010 he was sold to  the Mexican club Cruz Azul for €1.3M. In July 2010, he returned to Brazil, being loaned to Cruzeiro, moving later to Grémio in August 2011.

Honours
São Paulo
Campeonato Paulista: 2005
Copa Libertadores: 2005
FIFA Club World Cup: 2005
Campeonato Brasileiro Série A: 2006

Cruzeiro
Campeonato Mineiro: 2011

Atlético Mineiro
Recopa Sudamericana: 2014
Copa do Brasil: 2014
Campeonato Mineiro: 2015

References

External links

 Guardian Stats Centre 

1985 births
Living people
Sportspeople from Salvador, Bahia
Brazilian footballers
Association football defenders
São Paulo FC players
Fluminense FC players
Cruzeiro Esporte Clube players
Grêmio Foot-Ball Porto Alegrense players
Sport Club do Recife players
Clube Atlético Mineiro players
Campeonato Brasileiro Série A players
Primeira Liga players
Liga MX players
S.L. Benfica footballers
Cruz Azul footballers
K League 1 players
Seongnam FC players
Club Olimpia footballers
Goiás Esporte Clube players
Esporte Clube Vitória players
Expatriate footballers in Mexico
Expatriate footballers in Paraguay
Expatriate footballers in Portugal
Expatriate footballers in South Korea
Brazilian expatriate sportspeople in Mexico
Brazilian expatriate sportspeople in Portugal
Brazilian expatriate sportspeople in South Korea
Brazilian expatriate footballers
Brazil youth international footballers
Brazil under-20 international footballers